Live! At Nick's Fat City is the first live album by American rock singer Donnie Iris, released in 1998. Nick's Fat City is a now defunct nightclub that was located in Pittsburgh in the South Side Flats neighborhood.

Track listing
"Agnes" (Avsec, Iris) - 6:05
"Do You Compute?" (Avsec, Iris) - 4:52
"10th Street" (Avsec, Iris) - 4:09
"Tough World" (Avsec, Iris, Hoenes) - 5:29
"I Can't Hear You" (Avsec, Iris, McClain, Hoenes, Valentine) - 3:45
"That's the Way Love Ought to Be" (Avsec, Iris) - 4:52
"Poletown" (Avsec) - 6:06
"This Time it Must Be Love" (Avsec, Iris, Hoenes) - 4:39
"Injured in the Game of Love" (Avsec, Iris) - 8:43
"Minnie the Moocher" (Calloway, Mills, Gaskill) - 6:14
"Love Is Like a Rock" (Avsec, Iris, Hoenes, McClain, Valentine) - 6:39
"Ah! Leah!" (Avsec, Iris) - 7:06
"The Rapper" (Iris) - 5:15

Personnel
Donnie Iris - vocals
Mark Avsec - organ, accordion, synths, piano, vocals
Marty Hoenes - guitar and vocals
Paul Goll - bass guitar and vocals
Tommy Rich - drums

Production
Mark Avsec - Producer
Rick Witkowski - Co-producer

References

Donnie Iris albums
Albums produced by Mark Avsec
1998 live albums